Karup municipality was a municipality (Danish, kommune) in Viborg County until 1 January 2007.  The municipality covered an area of 163 km2, and had a total population of 6,709 (2005).  Its last mayor was Kjeld Merstrand, a member of the Social Democrats (Socialdemokraterne) political party. The main town and the site of its municipal council was the town of Karup.

Karup municipality ceased to exist as the result of Kommunalreformen ("The Municipality Reform" of 2007).  It was merged, with Bjerringbro, Fjends, Møldrup, Tjele, and Viborg municipalities to form an enlarged Viborg municipality.  This created a municipality with an area of 1,390 km2 and a total population of 88,945 (2005).  The municipality belongs to Region Midtjylland ("Mid-Jutland Region").

Official symbols
The municipality uses a coat of arms depicting a Black Grouse (in Danish: urfugl), a bird once typical for many areas in Jutland, but now extinct in Denmark. The municipality is one of the few Danish municipalities using its own flag; it is white with the coat of arms in the centre.

References  
 Municipal statistics: NetBorger Kommunefakta, delivered from KMD aka Kommunedata (Municipal Data)
 Municipal mergers and neighbors: Eniro new municipalities map

Former municipalities of Denmark